Hoe Jong-jil (born 15 August 1972) is a North Korean boxer. He competed in the men's bantamweight event at the 1996 Summer Olympics.

References

External links
 

1972 births
Living people
North Korean male boxers
Olympic boxers of North Korea
Boxers at the 1996 Summer Olympics
Place of birth missing (living people)
Bantamweight boxers